Hillside, also known as the Charles Schuler House, is a mansion overlooking the Mississippi River on the east side of Davenport, Iowa, United States. It has been individually listed on the National Register of Historic Places since 1982, and on the Davenport Register of Historic Properties since 1992. In 1984 it was included as a contributing property in the Prospect Park Historic District.

Charles Schuler
The house was designed by prominent Davenport architect Frederick G. Clausen and built from 1905 to 1906 for Charles Schuler. He owned Schuler Coal, which operated coal mines in southern Illinois, Iowa, Colorado, and Wyoming. Schuler was also involved in the lumber and construction businesses and the president of several other companies, including a bank. He is credited as being one of the businessmen that helped Davenport grow from a small city to an important commercial center in the first part of the 20th century. The house remained in the Schuler family until the 1950s.

Architecture

Hillside is considered a locally significant example of the Georgian Revival style. The house's design does not reflect the architectural features that were common in contemporary Victorian architecture, but incorporates elements of the Beaux-Arts and Art Nouveau styles.

The 2½-story mansion is a brick structure built on a limestone foundation. It follows a rectangular plan that features projecting semicircular bays or rectangular pavilions at the corners on the east and west sides. The home features a porte-cochere on the north side and porches on the east and west sides of the building. There is a porch that faces the south side that runs the length of the house whose floors are of hand-made mosaic tile. There is also a two-level projecting pavilion; the upper part of which was enclosed in the 1920s. The structure is capped by a decked hipped roof with roof dormers that feature semicircular pediments above round arch windows. At the roofline is a copper cornice. The interior of the home features many of original architectural features, which include stained glass, three fireplaces, tapestry walls, pocket doors, and mahogany woodwork. The house is situated on a corner lot at the top of a bluff with a commanding view of the river.

References

Houses completed in 1906
Georgian Revival architecture in Iowa
Houses in Davenport, Iowa
Houses on the National Register of Historic Places in Iowa
National Register of Historic Places in Davenport, Iowa
Individually listed contributing properties to historic districts on the National Register in Iowa
Davenport Register of Historic Properties
1906 establishments in Iowa